St. James Academy or St James Academy may refer to:

 St. James Academy (Kansas), United States
 St James Academy, Dudley, West Midlands, England

See also 
 St. James School (disambiguation) (includes similar name forms)